Yaung Chih-liang (born 11 March 1946) is a Taiwanese politician. He was the Minister of the Department of Health of the Executive Yuan from  2009 to 2011.

Education
Yaung obtained his bachelor's degree from the Department of Health Promotion and Health Education of the National Taiwan Normal University and master's degree in public health from National Taiwan University. He obtained his doctoral degree in the same field from the University of Michigan in the United States.

References

Living people
Kuomintang politicians in Taiwan
1946 births
University of Michigan School of Public Health alumni
Taiwanese Ministers of Health and Welfare
Politicians of the Republic of China on Taiwan from Taipei